Pleroma urvilleanum, synonym Tibouchina urvilleana, is a species of flowering plant in the family Melastomataceae, native to Brazil. 

Common names include:

glory bush
lasiandra
princess flower
pleroma
purple glory tree

The specific epithet urvilleanum commemorates the 19th-century French explorer and botanist Jules Dumont d'Urville.

Description

Cultivation 
Under the synonym Tibouchina urvilleana, Pleroma urvilleanum has gained the Royal Horticultural Society's Award of Garden Merit. 

However, it can also be grown outside in a sunny, sheltered spot. Plants are best grown in acidic and well-drained soils and spread by suckers. It can be trained as a vine and grown on a trellis.

References

Flora of Brazil
urvilleanum